Palmer Creek is a stream in Chippewa County, Minnesota, in the United States.

Palmer Creek was named for Frank Palmer, a pioneer settler.

See also
List of rivers of Minnesota

References

Rivers of Chippewa County, Minnesota
Rivers of Minnesota